Osmundaceae (royal fern family) is a family of ferns containing four to six extant genera and 18–25 known species. It is the only living family of the order Osmundales in the class Polypodiopsida (ferns) or in some classifications the only order in the class Osmundopsida. This is an ancient (known from the Upper Permian) and fairly isolated group that is often known as the "flowering ferns" because of the striking aspect of the ripe sporangia in Claytosmunda, Osmunda, Osmundastrum, and Plensium (subtribe Osmundinae). In these genera the sporangia are borne naked on non-laminar pinnules, while Todea and Leptopteris (subtribe Todinae) bear sporangia naked on laminar pinnules. Ferns in this family are larger than most other ferns.

Description 
The stems of Osmundaceae contain vascular tissue arranged as an ectophloic siphonostele; that is, a ring of phloem occurs on the outside only of a ring of xylem, which surrounds pith (and no other vascular tissue).
Stipules can be discerned at the leaf bases of these ferns. The hardened leaf bases are persistent and overlap to form a hardened layer surrounding the stem. Extinct members of the family, which flourished during the Mesozoic, could reach the stature of trees and be termed tree ferns. The leaves are either holodimorphic, with separate fertile and sterile fronds assuming an entirely different structure, or have fertile and sterile portions of the frond very distinct in structure.

Sporangia in the Osmundaceae are large, and open at a slit on the top; the annulus that drives the sporangium opening is on the side. 128 to 512 spores are typically present. The spores are green, nearly round, and trilete. The spores germinate into gametophytes, which are green (photosynthetic) and grow at the surface. They are large and heart-shaped. The base chromosome number for members of the order is 22.

Taxonomy

Smith et al. (2006) carried out the first higher-level pteridophyte classification published in the molecular phylogenetic era, creating four classes of ferns (Polypodiopsida). At that time they used the term Polypodiopsida sensu stricto to apply to the largest of these. Later the term Polypodiopsida sensu lato was used to refer to all four subclasses, and the large subclass renamed Polypodiidae. This is also referred to informally as the leptosporangiate ferns. The Polypodiidae contain seven orders whose phylogenic relationship is shown in the following cladogram, where Osmundales is seen as a sister to all other members of the subclass.

Subdivision 

In the Pteridophyte Phylogeny Group classification (2016) Osmundales consists of the single family Osmundaceae, six genera, and an estimated 18 species (Christenhusz and Byng give 25 species).

The three genera Osmunda, Leptopteris, and Todea were recognized as members of Osmundaceae by Smith et al. (2006) Of these, the largest genus, Osmunda, had traditionally been treated as three subgenera, Osmunda (3 species), Osmundastrum (2 species), and Plenasium (3–4 species). However, there was suspicion that the genus was not monophyletic.

The first molecular phylogeny  showed that Osmunda as traditionally circumscribed was paraphyletic and that Osmunda cinnamomea, despite its morphological similarity to Osmunda claytoniana, was sister to the rest of the family. This was later confirmed by a detailed species-level phylogeny of the family by Metzgar et al. (2008) leading to the resurrection of the segregate genus Osmundastrum, by elevating it from subgenus, to contain it and render Osmunda monophyletic. Todea and Leptopteris are consistently resolved as sister groups, and Osmunda was found to contain three separate subclades corresponding to subgenera (now genera) Osmunda, Plenasium, and the recently described Claytosmunda with the single species, Osmunda claytoniana.

The following phylogram shows the relationship between the Osmundaceae genera and subtaxa, according to Metzgar et al.:

The circumscription of the order and its families was not changed, and its placement remained the same in subsequent classifications including Chase and Reveal (2009), Christenhusz et al. (2011), and Christenhusz and Chase (2014). The find of an exceptionally well preserved Jurassic fossil intermediate between genus Osmunda (as shown above) and Osmundastrum lead to a re-analysis of Metzgar et al.'s data, which revealed that the Osmundaceae root used above may be wrong and a tree-branching artefact (all other ferns are genetically very distant from the Osmundaceae), and allowing the following classification:

A molecular dating study using Metzgar et al.'s data and a comprehensive set of rhizome and leaf fossils estimated that (sub)generic differentiation within Osmundaceae started by the Triassic and was finished by the Early Cretaceous with the formation of Osmunda and Plenasium. Accordingly, the PPG I classification of 2016 continues to place Osmundales in Polypodiidae, but splits Osmunda further by elevating its subgenera to genera (Claytosmunda, Plenasium). The following cladogram reproduces the PPG I concept for the extant members of the family:

The new system was used in a comprehensive taxonomic evaluation of Osmundales rhizome fossils, who provide a polytomous key using anatomical features of Osmundaceae rhizomes and an updated ‘evolutionary’ (non-cladistic) classification of fossil and extant Osmundales (see classification concepts for groups including extinct members), which can be tentatively transferred into the following cladogram (monophyla in bold, polytomies reflect unresolved relationships)

Notes: 
aMillerocaulis is a likely paraphyletic genus that includes forms ancestral to the modern Osmundaceae (classified as Osmundeae) as well as their potential sister lineages.
bThe morphology of Claytosmunda is primitive within the Osmundinae, and total evidence indicates that Osmunda and Plenasium likely evolved from a Claytosmunda-type ancestor, rendering the latter genus paraphyletic when Osmundaceae fossil should be considered. The genus comprises 12 fossil rhizome species in addition to the sole surviving species.

Evolution 
Bomfleur et al. state  that “Osmundales has arguably the richest and most informative fossil record of any extant group of ferns”. The order is well represented in the fossil record from the Permian onwards. Osmundalean or potentially osmundalean fern foliage including Anomopteris Brongn., Todites Seward, Cladotheca T.Halle, Osmundopsis T.M.Harris, Cacumen Cantrill & J.A.Webb, Osmunda, Damudopteris D.D.Pant & P.K.Khare, Dichotomopteris Maithy, and Cladophlebis Brongn., 1849) is commonly found from the Permian onwards together with dispersed spores such as Osmundacidites Couper and Todisporites Couper. But their affinitity to the Osmundales, and Osmundaceae in particular, is difficult to judge. In the Triassic foliage becomes frequent which is similar to identical to the fronds of modern-day Todea, Osmundastrum and Claytosmunda. The better understood rhizome fossil record indicates that the group was most diverse in the Permian, and already much reduced in the Triassic regarding the number of substantially different forms (see Bomfleur et al. and literature cited therein).

The first fossil representatives of the modern Osmundaceae (= tribus Osmundeae) include rhizome fossils with Claytosmunda-anatomy or with structural features characteristic for Osmundastrum cinnomomeum and its precursors. The same holds for the equally old leaf fossil record of the group. The main diagnostic feature of Osmundeae (modern Osmundaceae) is a heterogenous sclerenchymatic ring in the stipe basis. This potential synapomorphy is the only character differentiating between Osmundeae and the paraphyletic genus collecting their potential early ancestors and sister lineages, Millerocaulis. The basic Bauplan shared with 'Millerocaulis' was generally kept within the Osmundeae-lineage and only slightly to moderately modified in the last 200 million years. Triassic-Jurassic rhizome and frond morphologies remained essentially unaltered in the lineage leading to Claytosmunda claytoniana. This makes it impossible to discern direct ancestors of C. claytoniana from the ancestors of its sister lineages Osmunda and Plenasium), or their shared ancestors. Molecular dating placed the split between Osmunda and Plenasium, and their divergence from Claytosmunda in the Early Cretaceous, co-eval with the divergence between the sister genera Todea and Leptopteris. The Osmundastrum-lineage diverged much earlier (probably Middle Triassic), which fits with the new classification of re-evaluated rhizome fossils originally included in Millercaulis. A comprehensive list of rhizome and leaf fossils associated with modern Osmundaceae (Osmundeae in the classification of Bomfleur et al.) can be found at datadryad.org.

The only explicit reconstruction regarding the evolution of morphological traits in Osmundaceae can be found in Miller's groundbreaking work. Notable is that Permian rhizomes of both families in the Osmundales, the extinct Guaireaceae and the Osmundaceae including the extant species, show already relatively complex stele anatomies in comparison to the surviving members of the group. The rhizome fossil record also indicates several independent radiations of likely arborescent lineages, the Guaireaceae and Thamnopterioideae in the Permian, Osmundacaulis in the Triassic, and Plenasium (subgenus Aurealcaulis) in the late Cretaceous to Paleogene. As already noted by Miller, highly derived forms not directly related to the extant species and genera, can be found in the Jurassic and Cretaceous, such as Millerocaulis (Osmundacaulis) kolbii. Another general trend is that the Permian Osmundales were much larger than their modern counterparts. Today, the widespread species of Osmundaceae are rhizomatous with small, low-dissected steles.

References

Bibliography 

 
 
 
 
 
 
 
 

 
 
 
 
 
 
 
 
 , in 
C.Michael Hogan. 2010. Fern. Encyclopedia of Earth. National council for Science and the Environment. Washington, DC
Jud, Nathan, Gar W. Rothwell, and Ruth A. Stockey (2008). "Todea from the Lower Cretaceous of western North America: implications for the phylogeny, systematics, and evolution of modern Osmundaceae." American Journal of Botany, 95:330-339.
Thomas N. Taylor, Edith L. Taylor, Michael Krings: Paleobotany. The Biology and Evolution of Fossil Plants . Second Edition, Academic Press 2009, p. 437-443

External links

 
Fern families